The Narcotic Farms Act of 1929 is a United States federal statute authorizing the establishment of two narcotic farms for the preventive custody and remedial care of individuals acquiring a sedative dependence for habit-forming narcotic drugs. The United States public law designated the construction of the narcotic dependent treatment facilities, which became known as the United States Public Health Service Hospitals, with the first infirmary opening in 1935 at Lexington, Kentucky, while the second infirmary opened in 1938 at Fort Worth, Texas.

The H.R. 13645 legislation was passed by the U.S. 70th Congressional session and enacted into law by President Calvin Coolidge on January 19, 1929.

Repeal of Narcotic Farms Act of 1929
The 1929 United States public law was repealed by the enactment of the Public Health Service Act on July 1, 1944.

Abolishment of narcotic farms

By 1975, the two narcotic farm establishments had been abrogated as a national anti-narcotic treatment program in the rural United States. The narcotic farm concept was abandoned due to advancement in medication treatment along with United States legislative policies regarding narcotic sedative dependence.

Anti-narcotic treatment
 Drug detoxification
 Methadone
 Methadone maintenance
 Naloxone (1961)
 Naltrexone (1967)

Anti-narcotic legislative policies
 Narcotic Addict Rehabilitation Act of 1966
 Alcoholic and Narcotic Addict Rehabilitation Amendments of 1968
 Community Mental Health Centers Amendments of 1970
 Narcotic Addict Treatment Act of 1974

See also
 Anti-Heroin Act of 1924 
 Community Mental Health Act
 Deinstitutionalisation 
 Federal Bureau of Narcotics 
 Federal Correctional Institution, Fort Worth 
 Harry J. Anslinger
 Hugh S. Cumming
 Narcotic Drugs Import and Export Act
 Narcotics Manufacturing Act of 1960

References

United States Narcotic Farm Pictorial Biography

External links
 
 
 
 
 
 
 
 
 

1929 in American law
1929 in the United States
70th United States Congress
Drug policy of the United States
History of drug control